Ponsonby was a parliamentary electorate in Auckland, New Zealand from 1887 to 1890 and from 1946 to 1963. The Ponsonby electorate was represented by two Members of Parliament.

Population centres
In the 1887 electoral redistribution, although the Representation Commission was required through the Representation Act 1887 to maintain existing electorates "as far as possible", rapid population growth in the North Island required the transfer of three seats from the South Island to the north. Ten new electorates were created, including Ponsonby, and one former electorate was recreated. The electorate was based on the suburb of Ponsonby.

In December 1887, the House of Representatives voted to reduce its membership from general electorates from 91 to 70. The 1890 electoral redistribution used the same 1886 census data used for the 1887 electoral redistribution. In addition, three-member electorates were introduced in the four main centres. This resulted in a major restructuring of electorates, and the Ponsonby electorate was abolished again. The vast majority of its area went to the  electorate, and the balance to the  electorate.

The 1941 New Zealand census had been postponed due to World War II, so the 1946 electoral redistribution had to take ten years of population growth and movements into account. The North Island gained a further two electorates from the South Island due to faster population growth. The abolition of the country quota through the Electoral Amendment Act, 1945 reduced the number and increased the size of rural electorates. None of the existing electorates remained unchanged, 27 electorates were abolished, 19 electorates were created for the first time, and eight former electorates were re-established, including Ponsonby.

History
At the end of the parliamentary term in 1890, Peacock retired and the Ponsonby electorate was abolished.

Both the Social Credit and Communist Party candidates for Ponsonby in 1960 likewise contested Grey Lynn in 1963.

Members of Parliament
The electorate was represented by two Members of Parliament.

Key

Election results

1960 election

1957 election

1954 election

1951 election

1949 election

1946 election

Notes

References

Historical electorates of New Zealand
Politics of the Auckland Region
1887 establishments in New Zealand
1946 establishments in New Zealand
1890 disestablishments in New Zealand
1963 disestablishments in New Zealand